Saint Thomas Health (STH) is an integrated health delivery system based in Nashville, Tennessee. The name was shortened from Saint Thomas Health Services in 2011, and changed to Ascension Saint Thomas in 2020.

Saint Thomas Health is a member of Ascension Health, a Roman Catholic organization that is the largest not-for-profit health system in the United States. STH is composed of nine hospitals: three in Nashville, another major one in  Murfreesboro, and smaller ones in  Centerville, McMinnville, Smithville, Woodbury and Sparta, as well as multiple physician practices and outpatient centers.

The Ascension Saint Thomas CEO is Tim Adams, who is also the President of the regional system Ascension Tennessee.

Saint Thomas Health and the University of Tennessee Health Science Center  have established a partnership for training medical residents in a variety of specialties.

Hospitals

Ascension Saint Thomas Hospital West  
Formerly known as Saint Thomas Hospital.

Ascension Saint Thomas Hospital Midtown 
Formerly known as Baptist Hospital.

Ascension Saint Thomas Hospital - Rutherford

Saint Thomas Hickman Hospital 
Saint Thomas Hickman Hospital is located in Centerville, Tennessee

Saint Thomas River Park Hospital 
Saint Thomas River Park Hospital is located in McMinnville, Tennessee

Saint Thomas Dekalb Hospital 
Saint Thomas Dekalb Hospital is located in Smithville, Tennessee

Saint Thomas Stones River Hospital 
Saint Thomas Stones River Hospital is located in Woodbury, Tennessee

Saint Thomas Highlands Hospital 
Saint Thomas Highlands Hospital is located in Sparta, Tennessee.

Hospital for Specialty Surgery 
The Hospital for Specialty Surgery is located in Nashville, Tennessee

Special Centers

Saint Thomas Heart
Saint Thomas Heart is a collaborative effort among the Sanit Thomas Health family, providing complete cardiac services from more than 20 locations.

In 2008, Saint Thomas Heart was ranked #1 in Tennessee for Coronary Interventional Procedures by HealthGrades. Its hospitals received five-star ratings for the treatment of heart failure and atrial fibrillation, coronary interventional procedures and coronary services, and it was ranked among the top 5% in the nation for coronary interventions and the top 10% in the nation for cardiology services.

Chest Pain Network
The Saint Thomas Chest Pain Network is a division of Saint Thomas Health that coordinates with local emergency medical services (EMS) and hospitals to provide cardiac care services. It includes 15 hospitals in Tennessee and Kentucky, all accredited by the Society of Chest Pain Centers. The network includes different size facilities to provide initial treatment closest to the patient's home, and allow transfer into a specialized facility if additional care is required. In July 2008, the network expanded into Southern Kentucky when Monroe County Hospital in Tompkinsville was added.

Neurosciences Institute
The Saint Thomas Health Neurosciences Institute contains comprehensive brain, back, nervous system and spine centers. In 2008, independent health care rating company HealthGrades gave Saint Thomas a five-star rating for back and neck surgery.

The Saint Thomas Brain & Spine Tumor Center is a collaboration between the Neurosciences Institute and the Dan Rudy Cancer Center.

Bariatric Weight Loss Surgery Program
The Saint Thomas Health Bariatric Weight Loss Surgery Program provides a variety of weight loss procedures.

Orthopedics
STH provides a number of orthopedic services through its family of hospitals. In.  In 2008, the program was ranked in the top 5% in the nation for spine surgery by HealthGrades. Saint Thomas Orthopedics also received five-star ratings for overall orthopedic services, spine surgery, joint replacement, total knee replacement, back and neck surgery, and spinal fusion.  2015, the joint replacement services at Saint Thomas Health were consolidated into the Saint Thomas Joint Replacement Institute. It was rated among the top 10 in Tennessee by HealthGrades for Joint Replacement.

Sports Medicine

Saint Thomas Outpatient Rehabilitation is a specialized extension of its orthopedic program,  combines services including general orthopedics, physical therapy, aquatic therapy, athletic medicine and occupational therapy. The service is the exclusive health care provider to the Tennessee Titans, Tennessee Secondary School Athletic Association and Lipscomb University.
 
Saint Thomas Outpatient Rehabilitation clinics are found throughout Middle Tennessee, with locations in downtown Nashville, Antioch, Bellevue, Brentwood, Centerville, Green Hills, Murfreesboro, Pleasant View, Rivergate and Spring Hill, as well as at Lipscomb University in the Green Hills neighborhood of Nashville

Life Therapies
The Life Therapies clinics offer specialized rehabilitation therapy services in a relaxed, non-hospital atmosphere. This includes treatment of lymphedema, and neurological, post-stroke, vestibular, pediatric, oncology and women's health issues. The staff consists of licensed physical, occupational and speech therapists.

Until January 2009, the Life Therapies services were provided under the umbrella of Baptist Sports Medicine. It was determined that creating the new Life Therapies service line, would allow therapists and physicians to better treat patients who did not require traditional sports medicine.

The six clinics are found throughout Middle Tennessee, including locations at Baptist Medical Plaza I in downtown Nashville, Green Hills, Maryland Farms YMCA in Brentwood, Spring Hill and two locations in Murfreesboro.

Women's health
STH's hospitals partner together to provide women's health services that range from gynecology and breast health to pelvic health and birthing services. The Center for Pelvic Health is a specialized service line of Saint Thomas Health Services that focuses on treating pelvic health and urogynecological conditions in women, including urinary incontinence, fecal incontinence, sexual dysfunction and pelvic floor disorders. Saint Thomas Midtown Hospital is also home to a level III neonatal intensive care unit.

Cancer program
STH's Cancer Program provides treatment and prevention services.

As part of its treatment, the Saint Thomas Health Cancer Program partners with other institutions, including Cleveland Clinic and Tennessee Oncology, to partake in community-based clinical trials in oncology and related therapies.

Sponsorships
STH is the exclusive provider of medical services to the Tennessee Titans.

MissionPoint
In 2012 Saint Thomas Health started an Accountable care organization called MissionPoint Health Partners. MissionPoint is a participant in the Medicare Shared Savings Program, and currently has more than 1400 participating physicians in its network.

References

External links
Saint Thomas Health

Organizations based in Nashville, Tennessee
Healthcare in Tennessee